Kiran Pisda (born 1 January 2001) is an Indian women's professional footballer who plays as a forward for the India women's national football team and Kerala Blasters in the Kerala Women's League.  She is the first player from Chhattisgarh to play for the Indian senior national team.

Club career

Pisda was born to a tribal family in Chhattisgarh. She started her football career by playing for Durg. Pisda got her training from girls football academy under the supervision of coaches from sports and youth welfare department of Chhattisgarh. She played for Raipur in different state league tournaments and also played for Chhattisgarh in national leagues.   In 2022, she was signed by Kerala Blasters FC as a part of their newly launched women's team.

International career

In September 2022, she was included in the final 23 squad of Indian team to play in the 2022 SAFF Women's Championship

References

External links 
 

Living people
Footballers from Chhattisgarh
Sportswomen from Chhattisgarh
Indian women's footballers
India women's international footballers
Women's association football forwards
2001 births
Indian Women's League players
Kerala Blasters FC Women players